Ravon is an urban-type settlement in Fergana Region, Uzbekistan. It is the administrative center of Soʻx District. Its population is 7,800 (2016).

References

Populated places in Fergana Region
Urban-type settlements in Uzbekistan